Bishop William Richard Field S.M.A., was an Irish born priest who served as the Bishop of the Roman Catholic Diocese of Ondo in Nigeria.
Born in Schull, Co. Cork, Ireland in 1907, he was ordained a priest in 1934, he joined the Society of African Missions, Dr Field was appointed Bishop of Ondo, in 1958, succeeding Bishop Thomas Hughes SMA.
He was succeeded as Bishop of Ondo in 1976 by Bishop Francis Folorunsho Clement Alonge.

He died on 3 February 1988.

References

1907 births
1988 deaths
People from County Cork
Roman Catholic missionaries in Nigeria
20th-century Roman Catholic bishops in Nigeria
Roman Catholic bishops of Ondo